Via Mala is a 1945 German drama film directed by Josef von Báky and starring Karin Hardt, Carl Wery and Viktor Staal. It is an adaptation of the 1934 novel Via Mala by John Knittel. It was released in April 1945, a month before the unconditional surrender of Germany. The film is visually expressionist, something comparatively rare during the Nazi era.

Synopsis
In a rural village, the tyrannical Jonas Lauretz intimidates his family, mistress and neighbours. After he disappears one night, it is widely believed that his eldest daughter, Silvelie, has murdered him. A new investigating judge arrives in the village, he falls in love with Silvelie. He becomes torn between his love for her and his duty to investigate the potential crime. Eventually it emerges that it was not Silvelie who murdered Jonas Lauretz but the village innkeeper Bündner. He is forgiven by everyone because they all shared his desire to murder him.

Production
John Knittel's Swiss novel Vila Mala had been released in 1934 and become a major international success. The film rights were first acquired in 1941, but the period of production was lengthy and troubled. The screenplay by Thea von Harbou was first submitted to the censor on 21 May 1941, but was not passed until 28 February 1942. The Minister of Propaganda Joseph Goebbels then halted the project because it was "too gloomy" It was revived a year later, and in 1943 filming began at the Babelsberg Studios in Berlin and on location in Mayrhofen in Tyrol. A variety of further delays meant that the finished film was not ready until March 1944. This was still deemed unsatisfactory, and several scenes were re-shot. The ending moved away from that of the novel, where all family members except Silvelie were revealed to have taken part in the murder. It was finally submitted to the censor in January 1945.

Release
The film's release was also troubled. It was passed by the censors on 9 March 1945, but this was rescinded only ten days later. The downbeat plot was considered unsuitable in light of the recent war situation, as German forces were being pushed back on all fronts and escapist films were preferred. It was finally agreed that the film could go on general release only outside Germany.

The film premièred in Mayrhofen on 7 April 1945. It was not released in Germany until 16 January 1948, when it had its première in East Berlin.

Cast
 Karin Hardt as Silvelie 
 Carl Wery as Jonas Lauretz 
 Viktor Staal as Andreas von Richenau 
 Hilde Körber as Hanna 
 Hildegard Grethe as Frau Lauretz 
 Albert Florath as Der Amtmann
 Ferdinand Asper as Gast bei Bündner 
 Karl Hellmer as Jöry 
 Malte Jäger as Nikolaus 
 Carl Kuhlmann as Lukas Bündner 
 Ludwig Linkmann as Der Amtsdiener 
 Renate Mannhardt as Kuni 
 Heinz Günther Puhlmann as Angestellter von Bündner 
 F.W. Schröder-Schrom as Gast bei Bündner 
 Franz Lichtenauer as Gast bei Bündner 
 Klaus Pohl as Gast bei Bündner 
 Georg Vogelsang as Lechner-Bauer 
 Walter Werner as Dorfarzt

References

Bibliography
 O'Brien, Mary-Elizabeth. Nazi Cinema as Enchantment. The Politics of Entertainment in the Third Reich. Camden House, 2006.

External links

 Via Mala Full movie at the Deutsche Filmothek

1945 films
Films of Nazi Germany
1945 drama films
German drama films
1940s German-language films
Films about domestic violence
Films directed by Josef von Báky
Films set in Switzerland
Films set in the Alps
Films shot in Austria
Films shot in Germany
Films shot at Babelsberg Studios
Films based on Swiss novels
Films based on works by John Knittel
Films with screenplays by Thea von Harbou
UFA GmbH films
German black-and-white films